The year 1593 in science and technology involved some significant events.

Botany
 Founding of the Jardin des plantes de Montpellier by Pierre Richer de Belleval.
 Founding of the Botanischer Garten der Universität Heidelberg.
Carolus Clusius becomes Professor of Botany at Leiden University, taking charge of the Hortus Botanicus Leiden.

Geography
 John Norden begins publication of his Speculum Britanniae.

Mathematics
 François Viète publishes Viète's formula, the first in European mathematics to represent an infinite process.

Medicine
 First printed Arabic language edition of Abū ʿAlī al-Ḥusayn ibn ʿAbd Allāh ibn Sīnā's The Canon of Medicine.

Births

Deaths
 June 25 – Michele Mercati, Italian physician and botanist (born 1541)
 Li Shizhen, Chinese pharmacologist (born 1518).

References

 
16th century in science
1590s in science